The 2009–10 Indonesia Super League U-21 season will be the second edition of Indonesia Super League U-21 (ISL U-21), a companion competition Indonesian super league that are intended for footballers under the age of twenty-one years.

Pelita Jaya U-21 is the defending champion in this season. Djarum, an Indonesian tobacco company will continue its participation as the competition's main sponsor.

Format 
The competition is divided into three acts consist of two round the group and knockout round. The first round is divided into three groups each containing six clubs, two top teams of each group advanced to the second round. The second half consisted of two groups containing three teams in each group intended, the two best teams from each group advanced to the semifinals. The winner advanced to the final semi-final, while two teams who defeated third-ranked fight. Final winner becomes the champion.
Play On 29 November 2009 to 16 May 2010

Promotion and relegation 
Teams promoted to ISL U-21
 Persebaya Surabaya U-21
 PSPS Pekanbaru U-21
 Persema U-21
 Persisam Putra U-21

Teams relegated
 Persita U-21 (Previous runner-up)
 Deltras Sidoarjo U-21
 PSIS Semarang U-21
 PSMS Medan U-21

First round

Group A

Group B

Group C

Second round

Group M

Group N

Knockout round

Semifinal

Third placed

Final

Winner

Awards

References

External links
 Indonesia Super League standings (including U-21 ISL)

 
Indonesia Super League U-21 seasons
U